The Edmonds Cookery Book is a recipe book focusing on traditional New Zealand cuisine. It was first published as The Sure to Rise Cookery Book in 1908 as a marketing tool by baking powder manufacturer Thomas Edmonds (today part of Goodman Fielder), but it is now known as a Kiwi icon.

The cookbook has been through many editions and reprints, adapting to changing tastes and new technology. Only two copies of the first (1908) edition are known to survive. In 1955, the first "De Luxe" edition was introduced. The 69th De Luxe edition was released in 2016.

Since 1955, the front cover has featured the former Edmonds factory in Linwood, Christchurch (demolished in 1990). Spiral bounding was introduced in 1976 to allow the book to stay open and flat.

The book has been described as "as much a part of New Zealand kitchens as a stove and knife," and at one time it was "sent unsolicited to every newly engaged couple in New Zealand."

Edmonds recipe books have sold over 3,000,000 copies. It remains New Zealand's fastest selling book with over 200,000 copies sold in one year.

References

External links
Edmonds "Sure to Rise" Cookery Book third (1914) edition at the New Zealand Electronic Text Centre

1908 non-fiction books
Cookbooks
New Zealand cuisine
New Zealand books